The Archdiocese of Glasgow is the metropolitan see of the Province of Glasgow in the Roman Catholic Church in Scotland. The episcopal seat of the developing diocese was established by Saint Kentigern in the 6th century AD. It is one of two Latin Church metropolitan archdioceses of the Roman Catholic Church: the only archdioceses in Scotland. It is the elder of the two bishoprics. Innocent VIII first raised Glasgow a metropolitan archbishopric in 1492. The Metropolis has the dioceses of Motherwell and Paisley as suffragans within the Ecclesiastical Province.

It includes the city of Glasgow and extends to the town of Cumbernauld in the east, northwards to Bearsden, Bishopbriggs and Milngavie and westwards to Dumbarton, Balloch and Garelochhead. The Catholic population of the diocese is 224,344 (28.8%) out of a total population of 779,490 (2003 figures). Membership dropped to 215,000 (26,5 % out of the total population) by 2016.

Archbishop emeritus Mario Joseph Conti was appointed in 2002 by Pope John Paul II. Upon Conti's resignation in July 2012, having passed the required age of 75, Pope Benedict XVI appointed Philip Tartaglia, the Bishop of Paisley, to succeed him. Tartaglia was installed as archbishop in September 2012. He died in office on 13 January 2021: Saint Kentigern's feast day.

Not far from St. Enoch Square, and directly adjacent the St. Enoch Centre (the site of an early church of Glasgow's co-founding patron Saint Teneu on the River Clyde) , the seat of the archbishop is St Andrew's Cathedral, Glasgow.

History
Originally established by Saint Mungo, the diocese of Glasgow became important in the 12th century. It was organized by King David I of Scotland and John the Chaplain, Bishop of Glasgow. The bishopric became one of the largest and wealthiest in the Kingdom of Scotland, bringing wealth and status to the town. Somewhere between 1175 and 1178 this position was strengthened even further when Bishop Jocelin obtained for the episcopal settlement the status of burgh from King William I of Scotland, allowing the settlement to expand with the benefits of trading monopolies and other legal guarantees. Sometime between 1189 and 1195 this status was supplemented by an annual fair, which survives to this day as the Glasgow Fair.

Until 1560, when practice of the Roman Catholic Faith was suppressed by act of the Parliament of Scotland nearly all the bishops of Glasgow took an active share in the government of the country, whether as chancellors or treasurers of the kingdom or as members of regency during the minority of a sovereign. Robert Wishart (consecrated 1272, died 1316) was conspicuous for his patriotism during the Scottish War of Independence from England, and was the close friend of William Wallace and Robert Bruce. William Turnbull (consecrated 1447, died 1454) obtained in 1450 from Pope Nicholas V the charter of foundation for the University of Glasgow.

On 9 January 1492, Pope Innocent VIII raised the see to metropolitan rank, attaching to it the suffragan dioceses of Argyle, Dunblane, Dunkeld, and Galloway. James Beaton, nephew of the celebrated cardinal of the same surname, was the fourth and last archbishop of the old hierarchy.

In 1560, eight years after his nomination, he was forced to retire to France, where he acted as confidential agent of Mary, Queen of Scots, and later openly as ambassador for James VI, until his death in Paris, 25 April 1603. He carried away with him the diocesan records, "Registrum Vetus Ecclesiae Cathedralis Glasguensis", in handwriting of the 12th and 13th centuries, and "Liber Ruber Ecclesiae Glasguensis", with entries from about 1400 to 1476. These, along with other records, were in 1843 printed in a volume for the Maitland Club under the title: "Registrum Episcopatus Glasguensis: Munimenta Ecclesiae Metropolitanae Glasguensis a sede restauratâ saeculo ineunte XII ad reformatam religionem". A memorial of those times still remains in the old cathedral of St. Mungo, which was begun by Jocelin (consecrated 1175, died 1199) and received its last additions from Robert Blackadder (consecrated 1484, died 1508).

Glasgow did not again become a centre of Roman Catholic life until about the beginning of the 19th century during the process of Catholic Emancipation. The progress of the Industrial Revolution also began to draw to the city and its neighbourhood Roman Catholics from the Scottish Highlands and later, in far greater numbers, from Ireland. The arrival of the Irish necessitated Rev Andrew Scott, the sole Priest in Glasgow to begin the erection of the Catholic Cathedral in Clyde St in 1814 'for his vast Irish flock'.

Before 1795 the majority of the Catholics in Glasgow were from the Highlands. Mass had been celebrated from 1776 onwards by Bishop Hay and Bishop Geddes in a clandestine manner, first in High St, and later at the foot of the Saltmarket. In the 1780s a large colony of MacDonalds of Glengarry, on their way to America were forced to seek shelter from inclement weather, stayed on to work in the Glasgow Mills of the Monteith family. A priest from their native area joined them in 1792. In 1794 many of the MacDonalds left the city to join the regiment of Glengarry Fencibles. In 1795 the remainder of this group along with clan members from Glengarry sailed for America. They were accompanied by their pastor, Father Alexander MacDonald. Later, in the nineteenth century Irish Catholics arrived in greater numbers and had an effect on the city of Glasgow.

In 1827, the Holy See erected the Vicariate Apostolic of the Western District of Scotland. It was headed by a vicar apostolic, who was a consecrated bishop and who held a titular see. On the resignation of John Gray in 1869, archbishop Charles Petre Eyre was appointed the Apostolic Administrator of the Western District. On the Restoration of the Scottish hierarchy by Pope Leo XIII, 4 March 1878, the district was divided into the archdiocese of Glasgow, the Diocese of Argyll and the Isles and the Diocese of Galloway. archbishop Eyre was appointed the first Roman Catholic archbishop of Glasgow since the Scottish Reformation.

By 1877, a year prior to the institution of the current Roman Catholic archdiocese, Charles Eyre could record that in Glasgow city there were nineteen parishes, served by fifty-two priests, and in the county of Dunbarton, five parishes and seven priests.

Lanarkshire, which became Motherwell diocese in 1947–48, had seventeen parishes and twenty-two priests, while Renfrewshire, which became Paisley diocese in 1947–48, had eleven parishes and sixteen priests.

To train clergy, Eyre founded St Peter's College at Partickhill in 1874, and also encouraged the opening at Dowanhill in 1894 of Notre Dame teacher-training college. He was also committed to creating new parishes and breaking up over-large ones which he felt 'were almost dioceses in themselves'.

During the episcopate of his successor, John Aloysius Maguire, the Education (Scotland) Act 1918 was passed. Financial difficulties, including the triple burden of salaries, building costs, and rising educational expectations necessitated a settlement.

Maguire supported the War effort of 1914–18. In 1917, soldier-students, among them James Black, the future Bishop of Paisley, went to the front from St Peter's College, and two of the military chaplains from the archdiocese were killed. Although the seminary never closed during the First World War, at one point it housed only a single student and the rector.

Archbishop emeritus Mario Joseph Conti was appointed in 2002 by Pope John Paul II, and on Tuesday, 24 July 2012, Pope Benedict XVI accepted Conti's resignation and appointed Philip Tartaglia, the bishop of Paisley, to succeed Conti and be formally installed in September 2012.

Bishops

Past and present ordinaries

The following is a list of the modern archbishops of Glasgow and its precursor office:

Vicars Apostolic of the Western District
 Ranald MacDonald (appointed 13 February 1827 – died 20 September 1832)
 Andrew Scott (succeeded 20 September 1832 – resigned 15 October 1845)
 John Murdoch (succeeded 15 October 1845 – died 15 December 1865)
 John Gray (succeeded 15 December 1865 – resigned 4 March 1869)
 Charles Petre Eyre (appointed Apostolic Administrator 16 April 1869 – elevated archbishop of Glasgow 15 March 1878); see below

Archbishops of Glasgow
 Charles Petre Eyre (appointed 15 March 1878 – died 27 March 1902); see above
 John Aloysius Maguire (appointed 4 August 1902 – died 14 October 1920)
 (Sede vacante, 14 October 1920 – 24 February 1922)
 Donald Mackintosh (appointed 24 February 1922 – died 8 December 1943)
 Donald Alphonsus Campbell (appointed 6 January 1945 – died 22 July 1963)
 James Donald Scanlan (appointed 29 January 1964 – retired 23 April 1974)
 Thomas Winning (appointed 23 April 1974 – died 17 June 2001) (Cardinal in 1994)
 Mario Conti (installed 22 February 2002 – retired 24 July 2012)
 Philip Tartaglia (installed 8 September 2012 – died 13 January 2021)
 William Nolan (installed February 2022)

Coadjutor Vicars Apostolic
John Gray (1862–1865)
James Lynch, C.M. (1866–1869), did not succeed to see; appointed Coadjutor Bishop of Kildare and Leighlin, Ireland 
John Murdoch (1833–1846)
Andrew Scott (1827–1832)
Alexander Smith (1847–1861), died without succeeding to see

Coadjutor archbishop
Donald Aloysius Mackintosh (1912–1919), died without succeeding to see

Auxiliary Bishops
Joseph Devine (1977–1983), appointed Bishop of Moherwell
John Aloysius Maguire (1894–1902), appointed archbishop here
John Aloysius Mone (1984–1988), appointed Bishop of Paisley
Charles McDonald Renfrew (1977–1992)
James Ward (1960–1973)
Thomas Joseph Winning (1971–1974), appointed archbishop here; future Cardinal

Other priests of this diocese who became bishops
James Black, appointed Bishop of Paisley in 1948
Edward Wilson Douglas, appointed Bishop of Motherwell in 1948
Henry Grey Graham, appointed auxiliary bishop of Saint Andrews and Edinburgh in 1917
Kenneth Grant, appointed Bishop of Argyll and The Isles in 1945
John Keenan, appointed Bishop of Paisley in 2014
Peter Antony Moran (priest here, 1959–1992), appointed Bishop of Aberdeen in 2003
William Andrew Hart, appointed Bishop of Dunkeld in 1955
Angus MacDonald, appointed Bishop of Argyll and The Isles in 1878
Hugh MacDonald, C.SS.R. (priest here, 1867–1871), appointed Bishop of Aberdeen in 1890
Angus MacFarlane, appointed Bishop of Dunkeld in 1901
James William McCarthy, appointed Bishop of Galloway in 1914
Stephen McGill, P.S.S. (priest here, 1936), appointed Bishop of Argyll and The Isles in 1960
John McLachlan, appointed Bishop of Galloway in 1878
George John Smith, appointed Bishop of Argyll and The Isles in 1892
Philip Tartaglia, appointed Bishop of Paisley in 2005; later returned here as archbishop
John Toner, appointed Bishop of Dunkeld in 1914
Roderick Wright (priest here, 1964–1974), appointed Bishop of Argyll and The Isles in 1990

Parishes
Parishes within Glasgow

 St Andrew's Cathedral, Glasgow
 St. Agnes' – Lambhill
 St. Albert's – Pollokshields
 St. Aloysius – Garnethill
 St. Aloysius – Springburn
 St. Alphonsus – Calton
 St. Anne's – Denniston
 St. Anthony's – Govan
 St. Augustine's – Milton
 St. Barnabas' – Shettleston
 St. Bartholomew's – Castlemilk
 St. Benedict's – Drumchapel
 St. Bernadette's – Carntyne
 St. Bernard's – South Nitshill
 St. Brendan's – Yoker
 St. Brigid's – Toryglen
 St. Catherine's – North Balornock
 St. Charles' – North Kelvinside
 Christ the King – Kings Park
 St. Columba's – Woodside
 St. Constantine's – Govan
 St. Conval's – Pollok
 Corpus Christi – Scotstounhill
 St. Gabriel's – Merrylee
 St. Gregory's – Wyndford
 St. Helen's – Langside
 Holy Cross – Crosshill
 Holy Name – Mansewood
 Immaculate Conception – Maryhill
 Immaculate Heart of Mary – Balornock
 St. James' – Crookston
 St. Joachim's – Carmyle
 Blessed John Duns Scotus – Gorbals
 St. Joseph's – Tollcross
 St. Jude's and St John Ogilvie – Barlanark
 St. Laurence's – Drumchapel
 St. Leo's – Dumbreck
 St. Louise's – Deaconsbank
 St. Margaret Mary's – Castlemilk
 St. Maria Goretti's – Cranhill
 St. Mary's – Calton
 St. Mary Immaculate – Pollokshaws
 St. Michael's – Parkhead
 St. Mungo's – Townhead
 St. Ninian's – Knightswood
 Our Lady of Good Counsel – Denniston
 Our Lady of Lourdes – Cardonald
 Our Lady of Perpetual Succour – Broomhill
 Our Lady & St. George's – Penilee
 St. Patrick's – Anderston
 St. Paul's – Shettleston
 St. Paul's – Whiteinch
 St Peter's – Partick
 St. Philomena's – Provanmill
 St. Robert's – Househilwood
 St. Roch's – Garngad
 Sacred Heart – Bridgeton
 St. Simon's – Partick
 St. Teresa of Lisieux – Possilpark
 St. Thomas Apostle – Riddrie
 St. Vincent de Paul – Thornliebank
 Glasgow University – Turnbull Hall
 Strathclyde University Chaplaincy

 
Parishes outwith the Glasgow area

 Our Lady & St. Mark's – Alexandria
 Ss Peter and Paul – Arrochar
 St. Kessog's – Balloch
 St. Andrew's – Bearsden
 St. Dominic's – Bishopbriggs
 St. Matthew's – Bishopbriggs
 St. Ronan's – Bonhill
 St. Mahew's – Cardross
 St. Eunan's – Clydebank
 St. Margaret's – Clydebank
 Our Holy Redeemer's – Clydebank
 Our Lady & St. Helen's – Condorrat
 Holy Cross – Croy
 St. Joseph's – Cumbernauld
 St. Lucy's – Cumbernauld
 Sacred Heart – Cumbernauld
 St. Stephen's – Dalmuir
 St. Michael's – Dumbarton
 St. Patrick's – Dumbarton
 St. Peter's – Dumbarton
 St. Mary's – Duntocher
 St. Joseph's – Faifley
 St. Joseph's – Helensburgh
 St. Flannan's – Kirkintilloch
 Holy Family and St. Ninian – Kirkintilloch
 St. Joseph's – Milngavie
 St. Patrick's – Old Kilpatrick
 St. Martin of Tours – Renton
 St. Gildas' – Rosneath
 St. John of the Cross – TwecharFormer Parishes'''
 
 All Saints – Barmulloch (1971: closed 2014)
 St Bonaventure – Oatlands (1953: closed 1993 and demolished)
 St. Francis' – Gorbals (1868, 1881: community centre 1996)
 Good Shepherd – Dalbeth (church built 1902, parish founded 1949; closed 1975 and demolished 1996)
 St. John the Evangelist – Gorbals (1846: closed 1982 and demolished)
 St. John Ogilvie – Easterhouse (1957, 1960: closed 2008 and demolished)
 St. Joseph's – Woodside (1850: closed 1984 and demolished)
 St. Martin's – Castlemilk (1957, 1961: closed 2010)
 St. Monica's – Milton (1974: closed)
 St. Nicholas' – Bellgrove (built 1899 as St Anne's, parish founded 1949: demolished 1979)
 Our Lady of the Assumption – Ruchill (1956: closed 2000s)
 Our Lady of Consolation – Govanhill (1966, 1971: closed 2004)
 Our Lady of Fatima – Dalmarnock (1950: closed 2004 and demolished)
 Our Lady & St. Margaret's – Kinning Park (1876, 1882: destroyed by fire and demolished)
 Our Lady Queen of Peace – Glasgow (1978: closed 1987)
 Our Lady Star of the Sea – Garelochhead (1964, 1968: closed 2005)
 St. Philip's – Ruchazie (1958: closed 2014)
 St. Pius X – Drumchapel (1954, 1957: closed 2000s)
 St. Stephen's - Sighthill (1970, 1972: demolished)
 St. Vincent's – Calton (1859: closed 1902 and demolished)

See also

Presbytery of Glasgow (Church of Scotland)
Diocese of Glasgow and Galloway (Scottish Episcopal Church)

Notes

References

External links
Archdiocese of Glasgow
GCatholic.org

Glasgow Cathedral Precinct –  Provides an extensive history of the pre-Reformation diocese.

Christianity in Glasgow
Glasgow
1878 establishments in Scotland
1878 in Christianity
Roman Catholic Ecclesiastical Province of Glasgow